Hara is a genus of South Asian river catfishes native to South Asia from India to Myanmar.

Species
There are currently 10 recognized species in this genus:
 Hara filamentosa Blyth, 1860
 Hara hara (F. Hamilton, 1822)
 Hara horai Misra, 1976
 Hara jerdoni F. Day, 1870
 Hara koladynensis Anganthoibi & Vishwanath, 2009
 Hara longissima H. H. Ng & Kottelat, 2007
 Hara mesembrina H. H. Ng & Kottelat, 2007
 Hara minuscula H. H. Ng & Kottelat, 2007
 Hara nareshi Mahapatra & S. Kar, 2015 
 Hara spinulus H. H. Ng & Kottelat, 2007

References

Erethistidae
Catfish genera
Freshwater fish genera
Taxa named by Edward Blyth